Uzbekistan national boxing athletes represents Uzbekistan in regional, continental and world tournaments sanctioned by the Amateur International Boxing Association (AIBA).

Olympics

2004 Athens Olympics

Uzbekistan sent nine boxers to Athens. All nine made it past the round of 32, with five victories and four byes. Four of the boxers fell in the round of 16 (two of which had not had matches in the round of 32). Three more barely missed medalling by being defeated in the quarterfinals, while the two that had won their quarterfinal bouts both lost in the semifinals to earn bronze medals. These two bronze medals put the Uzbekis in a four-way tie for 12th place in the boxing medals count. The combined record of the nine boxers was 12-9.

Entry list

 Tulashboy Doniyorov (Flyweight)
 Bahodirjon Sooltonov (Bantamweight) - Bronze medalist
 Bekzod Khidirov (Featherweight)
 Dilshod Mahmudov (Light Welterweight)
 Sherzod Husanov (Welterweight)

 Sherzod Abdurahmonov (Middleweight)
 Utkirbek Haydarov (Light Heavyweight) - Bronze medalist
 Igor Alborov (Heavyweight)
 Rustam Saidov (Super Heavyweight)

Asian Games

2006 Doha Asian Games

10 amateur boxers represents Uzbekistan in this edition of the Asiad. This country brought home 5 gold medals  at the last Asian Games in Busan, South Korea.

Entry list

 Utkirbek Haydarov (Light Heavyweight)
 Bekzod Khidirov (Lightweight)
 Dilshod Mahmudov (Light Welterweight)
 Jasur Matchanov (Heavyweight)
 Elshod Rasulov (Middleweight)

 Rustam Saidov (Super Heavyweight)
 Orzubek Shayimov (Bantamweight)
 Bahodirjon Sultonov (Featherweight)
 Rafikjon Sultonov (Light Flyweight)
 Behzodbek Yunusov (Welterweight)

References

Amateur boxing
Boxing in Uzbekistan